Mohammad or Muhammad Kashif may refer to:

 Mohammad Kashif (Dutch cricketer), Dutch cricketer
 Muhammad Kashif (Kuwaiti cricketer) (born 1987), Kuwaiti cricketer
 Muhammad Kashif (kabaddi), Pakistani kabaddi player